Vasil Kozma Eshcoff was an emigrant from Ottoman Macedonia, known as a pioneer of the Coney Island hot dog in Fort Wayne, Indiana. He was also briefly the second president of the Macedonian Patriotic Organization.

Biography 
Vasil Eshcoff was born in 1882 in the Kostur village of Visheni, then in the Ottoman Empire. In 1910 he emigrated to Fort Wayne, Indiana, USA, where he was involved in the work of the local Macedonian-Bulgarian society, founded on November 21, 1921 by settlers from Kostur region. They initiated the establishment of the pro-Bulgarian Macedonian Political Organization in Fort Wayne on October 2, 1922.

At the Second Congress of the Organization, held in Indianapolis in the early September 1923, he was elected a president of the organization. The governing body also included   - vice president, Mike Kozma - treasurer, Mihail Nikolov - secretary and Pavel Angelov from Chicago - adviser.

In 1927 in Fort Wayne the local organization of the MPO established a Macedono-Bulgarian school and he participated in the initiative. He was a member of the Board of Trustees of St. Nicholas Orthodox Church in Fort Wayne at the Bulgarian Diocese of Toledo.  

Fort Wayne's Coney Island Weiner Stand where the famous Coney Island hot dogs are still offered was developed by Vasil Eshcoff and his partners from MPO Vasil Litchin and Kiriyak Geroff.

He died on June 15, 1961 in Fort Wayne. The restaurant he founded remains the hands of the Eshcoff and Choka families.

See also 
 Slavic speakers of Greek Macedonia
 Macedonian Americans
 Macedonian Bulgarians

Notes

Footnotes

External link
 Македонски алманахъ. Индианаполисъ, Индиана, САЩ, Централенъ Комитетъ на Македонскитѣ политически организации въ Съединенитѣ щати, Канада и Австралия, 1940. (in pre-1945 Bulgarian ortography);  Macedonian Almanac. Indianapolis, Indiana, USA, Central Committee of Macedonian Political Organizations in the United States, Canada and Australia, 1940.

 Fort Wayne's Famous Coney Island Wiener Stand official website, history page

People from Kastoria (regional unit)
People from Manastir vilayet
American people of Macedonian descent
Macedonian businesspeople
Macedonian Bulgarians
Bulgarian emigrants to the United States
Bulgarians from Aegean Macedonia
Macedonian emigrants